Ramzy Małe  is a village in the administrative district of Gmina Sztum, within Sztum County, Pomeranian Voivodeship, in northern Poland. The village has a population of 90.

For the history of the region, see History of Pomerania.

References

Villages in Sztum County